Mooreana trichoneura, the yellow flat, is a butterfly belonging to the family Hesperiidae and subfamily Pyrginae (flats). It has a wingspan of 32–36 mm.

Description 
Its upperside is dark brown, and the forewing has a number of white hyaline (glass-like) spots and strokes in the outer half of the wing, while the hindwing has a series of black wedge-shaped discal spots and a yellow tornal area. The underside of the hindwing is predominantly yellowish white.

Distribution 
The yellow flat has a wide distribution. It ranges from India to Thailand to Malaysia and can even be found in the Philippines. In 2012, it was discovered in Singapore.

Habitat 
The yellow flat is usually found in lowland forests up to 833 m (2500 ft).

Habits 
Like other butterflies in its subfamily, it flies quickly and usually rests on the underside of a leaf with its wings open flat.

Host plant 
 Mallotus paniculatus

Subspecies 
 Mooreana trichoneura trichoneura
 Mooreana trichoneura pralaya (Moore, [1866])
 Mooreana trichoneura multipunctata (Crowley, 1900) (Haina)
 Mooreana trichoneura nivosa (Fruhstorfer, 1909) (Nias)
 Mooreana trichoneura nava (Fruhstorfer, 1909) (Java)

The subspecies of Mooreana trichoneura found in India are-

 Mooreana trichoneura pralaya Moore, 1865 – Yellow-veined Flat

References 

Butterflies of Singapore
Butterflies of Asia
Butterflies of Malaysia
Tagiadini
Butterflies described in 1860
Butterflies of Indochina
Taxa named by Baron Cajetan von Felder
Taxa named by Rudolf Felder